Gladys Kelley Fitch (1896–1971) was an American painter. She resided in Lyme, Connecticut and was a member of the Old Lyme art colony.

Notable collections
"Flower arrangement" - c. 1940, watercolor, crayon, and pencil on paper, Smithsonian American Art Museum

Further reading
Fitch, Gladys Kelley. Creative art expression and appreciation : a method of developing student ability ... a way to bridge the interval between student and professional approach. 1937.

References

1896 births
1971 deaths
Painters from Connecticut
People from Lyme, Connecticut
People from Old Lyme, Connecticut
American women painters
20th-century American women artists
20th-century American people